Ben Binnendijk (15 November 1927 – 24 December 2020) was a Dutch rower. He competed in the men's coxless pair event at the 1952 Summer Olympics.

References

1927 births
2020 deaths
Dutch male rowers
Olympic rowers of the Netherlands
Rowers at the 1952 Summer Olympics
Sportspeople from Utrecht (city)